Lauri Asikainen (born 28 May 1989) is a Finnish former Nordic combined athlete. He was born in Savonlinna, and made his senior Nordic combined debut in 2009, at the world championships in Liberec. He was previously a ski jumper, winning team bronze in 2007 at the World Junior Championships in Tarvisio. He is currently the hill coach for the Finland nordic combined team.

References

External links
 Lauri Asikainen's web site

1989 births
Living people
People from Savonlinna
Finnish male ski jumpers
Finnish male Nordic combined skiers
Sportspeople from South Savo
21st-century Finnish people